Louis Jay Meyers (June 21, 1955 – March 11, 2016) was an American festival organizer and co-founder of South By Southwest. He was born in Austin, Texas. Meyers was the event’s primary music booker until he sold his share in the event after the 1994 conference, citing stress and health concerns. 

Meyers was also an accomplished multi-instrumentalist and producer. From 2005 to 2013, Meyers was executive director of Folk Alliance International. 

Meyers was admitted to a hospital on March 10, 2016 and initially was diagnosed with blood clots. He then died of a suspected heart attack the next day at his home, at the age of 60.

References

1950s births
2016 deaths
People from Austin, Texas